Arthur Balbaert (27 May 1879 – 14 October 1938) was a Belgian sports shooter  who competed at the 1920 Summer Olympics and the 1924 Summer Olympics.

References

External links
 

1879 births
1938 deaths
Belgian male sport shooters
Olympic shooters of Belgium
Shooters at the 1920 Summer Olympics
Shooters at the 1924 Summer Olympics
Sportspeople from Roubaix
French emigrants to Belgium